The Southern League was the amatorial football championship in Southern Italy during the 20's of the 20th century.

The 1923–24 season was organized within the Italian Football Federation. The winner had the honor to play against the Northern Champions.

The League maintained the goal to improve the quality of the game in the area. Southern semifinals with six matchdays followed the regional phase of ten matchdays.

Qualifications

Marche 
Anconitana was the only registered team and advanced directly Southern Italy Semifinals.

Lazio

Classification

Results table

Tie-breaker 
Played on May 4, 1924, in Rome.

Campania

Classification

Results table

Apulia

Classification

Results table

Sicily

Qualification 

Repetition

Palermo qualified for the semifinals.

Semifinals

Group A

Classification

Results table

Group B

Classification

Results table

Tie-breaker

Finals

Because of the sole points were considered by the championship regulations, with no relevance to the aggregation of goals, a tie-break was needed.

Tie-breaker

Savoia qualified for the National Finals.

Footnotes

Football in Italy